Eduard Kukan (26 December 1939 – 10 February 2022) was a Slovakian politician who served as Minister of Foreign Affairs from 1998 to 2006. He was a candidate in the presidential election held on 3 April 2004, and although pre-election polls had suggested he would come first, he actually came in third behind the eventual President Ivan Gašparovič and former prime minister Vladimír Mečiar, thus preventing him from contesting the run-off. He was elected Member of the European Parliament (MEP) in 2009, a position he held until 2019.

In 1999, Kukan was appointed United Nations Special Envoy on Kosovo by UN Secretary General Kofi Annan, a role he held alongside Carl Bildt.

Sq:Eduard Kukan

Early life and education
Kukan graduated from The Moscow State Institute of International Relations in 1964, where he also gained a strong knowledge of the Swahili language. After graduation he received a Doctorate in Law from the Faculty of Law of the Charles University in Prague.

Diplomatic career
Since then his employments have included:

Ministry of Foreign Affairs of Czechoslovakia in Prague (began on 1 August 1964)
Headquarters in the Department of Sub-Saharan Africa (1964–1968)
Secretariat of the Minister (1973–1977)
Director of the Department of Sub-Saharan Africa (1981–1985)
Director of the Department of Latin America (1988–1990)
Czechoslovak Embassy in Lusaka (1968–1973)
Czechoslovak Embassy in Washington as Minister-Counsellor and Deputy Ambassador (1977–1981)
Czechoslovak Embassy in Addis Ababa as Ambassador (1985–1988)
Permanent Representative of Czechoslovakia to the United Nations in New York (1991)
Permanent Representative of Slovakia to the UN (1993)
UN Chairman of the Committee for Social, Humanitarian, and Cultural Affairs
Special Envoy for the Balkans (1991–2001)
Minister of Foreign Affairs of Slovakia (March 1994 – December 1994)
Minister of Foreign Affairs of Slovakia (October 1998 – 2006)
Special Envoy for the Balkans (1991–2001)

Member of the European Parliament, 2009–2019
Kukan has been a Member of the European Parliament since the 2009 European elections. In the election campaign, he led the list of candidates of the centre-right Slovak Democratic and Christian Union (SDKÚ).

Kukan has since been serving on the Committee on Foreign Affairs. In addition, he was a member of the Subcommittee on Human Rights between 2009 and 2014. In 2014, he moved to the Subcommittee on Security and Defence.

In 2010, Kukan joined the Friends of the EEAS, an unofficial and independent pressure group formed because of concerns that the High Representative of the Union for Foreign Affairs and Security Policy Catherine Ashton was not paying sufficient attention to the Parliament and was sharing too little information on the formation of the European External Action Service.

Kukan led the parliament's monitoring mission during the Ugandan general elections in 2016.

Other activities
 Global Panel Foundation, Member of the Board of Advisors 
 He was a teacher at the Comenius University in Bratislava, Faculty of Law, Department of International Law and International Relations.

Personal life and death
Kukan was married and had two adult children. In addition to his native tongue and Swahili, he spoke English, Russian, and Spanish. In 1993, he was awarded an honorary law degree by the Upsala College in New Jersey.

He died from a heart attack in Bratislava on 9 February 2022, at the age of 82.

References

External links
Moscow State Institute of International Relations

1939 births
2022 deaths
Foreign Ministers of Slovakia
Slovak diplomats
Moscow State Institute of International Relations alumni
Permanent Representatives of Czechoslovakia to the United Nations
Permanent Representatives of Slovakia to the United Nations
Slovak Democratic and Christian Union – Democratic Party MEPs
MEPs for Slovakia 2009–2014
MEPs for Slovakia 2014–2019
Ambassadors of Czechoslovakia to Ethiopia
Candidates for President of Slovakia
People from Šaľa District
Members of the National Council (Slovakia) 1994-1998
Members of the National Council (Slovakia) 2006-2010